Saddleback, sometimes called Old Saddleback or Saddleback Mountain, is a natural landmark formed by the two highest peaks of the Santa Ana Mountains and the gap between them. Resembling a saddle as viewed from most of Orange County, California, this landform dominates the county's eastern skyline. On the clearest days, Saddleback is visible from most of the Greater Los Angeles area.
 
The two peaks form part of the border between Orange and Riverside counties. 

The hilly landscape in south Orange County is known colloquially as Saddleback Valley, and hence many institutions are named after Saddleback, including Saddleback Church, Saddleback College, and the Saddleback Valley Unified School District.

The presence of volcanic rocks in Silverado Canyon indicates that Saddleback Mountain was formed prior to the development of the San Andreas Fault, back when a subduction zone occurred where the Pacific Plate went under California.

References

Landforms of Orange County, California
Santa Ana Mountains